This is a list of airports in Madhya Pradesh state in India.

Airports

References

External links

AAI traffic news

 Money Control MoneyControl web site
 Infra News Infra News web site
 Full Stop India Full Stop India web site

 
Airports
Madhya Pradesh